Muelle was a trademark signature and design by Juan Carlos Argüello, Spanish graffiti pioneer (circa 1966–1995).

Around 1980, during the Madrilene cultural Movida, Argüello started reproducing the logo he had designed in walls and public spaces of Madrid. It consisted of the word Muelle (Spanish for spring), or an R with an enclosing circle (®) and a line in the shape of a coiled spring ending in an arrowhead. At first he used an ink marker, and later spraypainted his signature extensively around Madrid (and to a lesser extent, in other Spanish localities). In the eighties, he improved his technique, using several colours, wider borders, and 3-D effects.

His innovative style, along with the profusion of his tags made his work popular. Many other Madrilene youths created their own tags inspired by Muelle's, often ending strokes with arrowheads. The spread of hip-hop culture in Spain in the late 1980s introduced the new graffiti styles developed in the United States, but variations in Muelle's work basically kept his original design. Argüello appeared in Spanish television and newspapers.

External links
Photographs at Madrid Old School Graffiti, an aficionado's web.

See also 
 Akim Hoste

1960s births
1995 deaths
Spanish graphic designers
History of Madrid
20th-century Spanish painters
20th-century Spanish male artists
Spanish male painters
Spanish graffiti artists